Salt River Township is an inactive township in Ralls County, in the U.S. state of Missouri.

Salt River Township takes its name from the Salt River.

References

Townships in Missouri
Townships in Ralls County, Missouri